The men's high jump event was part of the track and field athletics programme at the 1920 Summer Olympics. The competition was held from Sunday 15 to Tuesday 17 August 1920. 22 high jumpers from nine nations competed. No nation had more than 4 jumpers, suggesting the limit had been reduced from the 12 maximum in force in 1908 and 1912. The event was won by Richmond Landon of the United States, the nation's sixth consecutive victory in the men's high jump. The American team also took silver, with Harold Muller finishing second. Sweden won its first medal in the event with Bo Ekelund's bronze.

Background

This was the sixth appearance of the event, which is one of 12 athletics events to have been held at every Summer Olympics. Returning finalists from the 1912 Games were ninth-place finisher Timothy Carroll and eleventh-place finisher Benjamin Howard Baker, both of Great Britain. The American team was favored; John Murphy had won the U.S. trials, with Richmond Landon second and Harold Muller third.

Czechoslovakia, Greece, and Luxembourg each made their debut in the event. The United States appeared for the sixth time, having competed at each edition of the Olympic men's high jump to that point.

Competition format

The competition used the two-round format introduced in 1912. There were two distinct rounds of jumping with results cleared between rounds. All jumpers clearing 1.80 metres in the qualifying round advanced to the final. There were jump-offs in the final to resolve ties.

Records

These were the standing world and Olympic records (in metres) prior to the 1920 Summer Olympics.

Richmond Landon set a new Olympic record with 1.936 metres.

Schedule

Results

Qualifying

High jumpers clearing 1.80 metres advanced to the final.

Final

In a jump-off for silver, Muller beat Ekelund 1.88 metres to 1.85 metres. In a jump-off for fourth and fifth place, Whalen prevailed over Murphy though both jumped 1.89 metres.

References

Sources
 
 

High jump
High jump at the Olympics